Forois ('Forward') was the Yiddish-language organ of the Palestine Communist Party,  launched in 1926, ceased publication in 1932.

References

Ashkenazi Jewish culture in Mandatory Palestine
Defunct newspapers
Newspapers published in Mandatory Palestine
Yiddish communist newspapers
Yiddish culture in Mandatory Palestine